Triumph of Death may refer to:

Visual arts
The Triumph of Death (canvas, 1562) by Pieter Bruegel the Elder at Museo del Prado
Triumph of Death (Palermo), (detached fresco, 1446) by unknown artist at Palazzo Abatellis, Sicily, Italy
Triumph of Death  (former fresco, 14th century) attributed to Buonamico Buffalmacco at Camposanto of Pisa, Tuscany, Italy
Triumph of Death  (fresco, late 14th century) by Bartolo di Fredi at San Francesco, Lucignano, Tuscany, Italy

Other uses
The Triumph of Death (ballet) (1971), with choreography by Flemming Flindt and music by Thomas Koppel
Triumph of Death (Hellhammer), a demotape by band Hellhammer

See also
Danse Macabre
Dance of Death (disambiguation)